Luis Carlos Cardozo (born 10 October 1988) is a Paraguayan football centre back and full back who played for Mexican club Monarcas Morelia, on loan from Cerro Porteño.

On 19 July 2015, Paraguayan newspaper ExtraPRESS named Cardozo one of the most expensive player in Paraguay.

References

External links
 BDFA profile
 

1988 births
Living people
Paraguayan footballers
Paraguay international footballers
Paraguay under-20 international footballers
Paraguayan expatriate footballers
Association football midfielders
Paraguayan Primera División players
Cerro Porteño players
Atlético Morelia players
Liga MX players
Expatriate footballers in Mexico
Sportspeople from Asunción